Arnold Suppan (born 18 August 1945 in St. Veit an der Glan) is an Austrian historian who studies Eastern Europe in the twentieth century. He is a faculty member at Andrássy University Budapest and University of Vienna. He was secretary-general of the Austrian Academy of Sciences from 2009–2011 and vice president from 2011–2013. He was director of the Institute for Eastern European History at the University of Vienna since 2002.

Works

References

Further reading

1945 births
Living people
20th-century Austrian historians
Austrian Academy of Sciences
Andrássy University Budapest
Academic staff of the University of Vienna
21st-century Austrian historians